Wendell Xavier Ramos (born August 18, 1978) is a Filipino actor and model who is currently under GMA Network after ABS-CBN and TV5.

Biography and early career
Ramos started his showbiz career in 1995 when he joined the cast of Bubble Gang along with his long time best friend Antonio Aquitania. He got into "matinee idol" status when he joined Click. He then had roles with female stars like Ara Mina and Diana Zubiri, among others, in different films during the 2000s. He then moved to GMA Network shows including Sinasamba Kita, La Vendetta, Kung Mahawi Man ang Ulap and Tasya Fantasya. His biggest break came when he played the role of Harvey in Ako si Kim Samsoon which starred Regine Velasquez, Mark Anthony Fernandez and Nadine Samonte.

Current career
Ramos is also one of the models of Bench along with famous stars such as Richard Gomez, Richard Gutierrez, Dingdong Dantes, Alessandra de Rossi and Francine Prieto, to name a few. Wendell moved to ABS-CBN in 2015, staying until 2018, when he decided to return to his original home GMA Network.

Personal life
Ramos has three children with three different non-showbiz girlfriends. He married his partner Kukai Guevara on December 9, 2017.

He is also the cousin of singer-actor Erik Santos

Awards and nominations

Filmography

Film
2021: On the Job: The Missing 8 - Pedring Eusebio's son
2017: Minda
2015: Beauty and the Bestie
2015: Felix Manalo
2013: Bayang Magiliw
2012: El Presidente
2012: Corazon: Ang Unang Aswang - Ryan
2011: Wedding Tayo, Wedding Hindi - Benito "Ben" Matias
2008: Desperadas 2 - Dave/Diana
2008: Shake, Rattle & Roll X - monster
2007: Do-Se-Na
2007: Happy Hearts - Louie
2006: Sukob - Dale
2004: Sabel - Sabel's rapist, Jojo
2003: Filipinas - Narciso Filipinas
2003: Keka - Jason Sanchez
2003: Sex Drive - Winston/Philip
2002: Bakit Papa
2002: Two Timer - Andrei
2002: Bedtime Stories
2002: Gamitan - Nicolas Fernandez
2001: Most Wanted
2001: Hubog - Oliver
1997: Nagmumurang Kamatis
1996: Taguan - Lemuel
1996: Kabilin-bilinan ni Lola

Television

References

External links
 
 

1978 births
Living people
Filipino male film actors
Filipino male television actors
Filipino male comedians
Filipino Roman Catholics 
People from Parañaque
People from Tondo, Manila
Male actors from Manila
20th-century Filipino male actors
21st-century Filipino male actors
GMA Network personalities
TV5 (Philippine TV network) personalities
ABS-CBN personalities